ISO 45001 is an ISO standard for management systems of occupational health and safety (OHS), published in March 2018.  The goal of ISO 45001 is the reduction of occupational injuries and diseases, including promoting and protecting physical and mental health.

The standard is based on OHSAS 18001, conventions and guidelines of the International Labour Organization, and national standards. It includes elements that are additional to OHSAS 18001 which it is replacing over a three-year migration period from 2018 to 2021. As of March 2021, companies and organizations should have migrated to ISO 45001 to retain a valid certification, although ISO has extended the transition period for up to six months  (to 11 September 2021) for organizations adversely affected by COVID-19.

ISO 45001 follows the High Level Structure of other ISO standards, such as ISO 9001:2015 and ISO 14001:2015, which makes integration of these standards easier.

Development
ISO 45001 was proposed at the ISO in October 2013. The committee ISO/PC 283, created in 2013, had direct responsibility for the standardization process. At least 70 countries contributed to the drafting process. Preparation and committee work lasted until December 2015. From 2015 to 2017, a first draft failed to gain sufficient approval from ISO members and was revised in a second draft, which was approved and refined into a final draft. In the final vote, the standard garnered 62 votes in favour, nine abstentions and four votes against from France, India, Spain, and Turkey. The standard was published on 12 March 2018.

Certification 
ISO 45001 is set to replace OHSAS 18001 over three years following its publication in March 2018. BSI will formally withdraw OHSAS 18001 in September 2021, at the end of the extended migration period (due to COVID-19). ISO 45001 uses the management system standard structure guideline Annex SL to allow for simplified integration with other management system standards, such as ISO 9001 and ISO 14001. The International Accreditation Forum has published requirements for migration from OHSAS 18001 to ISO 45001.

Organizations with a pre-existing OHSAS certification that migrate to ISO 45001:2018 can consider both certifications as one. For example, an OHSAS 18001 certification from 2017 that is migrated to ISO 45001:2018 in 2020 will be considered as having run from 2017.

ISO/IEC TS 17021-10:2018 is a technical specification setting out competence requirements for auditing and certification of ISO 45001.

Adoption 
ISO 45001 was adopted as a national standard by Albania, Argentina, Armenia, Austria, Australia, Azerbaijan, Belgium, Bolivia, Bosnia and Herzegovina, Brazil, Bulgaria, Canada, Chile, Colombia, Costa Rica, Croatia, the Czech Republic, Denmark, Ecuador, El Salvador, Estonia, Finland, Georgia, Germany, Greece, Honduras, Hungary, Iceland, India, Indonesia, Ireland, Israel, Italy, Japan, Kazakhstan, Latvia, Lithuania, Malaysia, Moldova, the Netherlands, New Zealand, North Macedonia, Norway, Paraguay, Peru, the Philippines, Poland, Portugal, Romania, Russia, Serbia, Singapore, Slovakia, Slovenia, South Africa, Sri Lanka, Sweden, Switzerland, Turkey, the United Kingdom, the United States, Uruguay, and Uzbekistan.N-

ISO 45001 changes compared to OHSAS 18001 

 Context of the organization (Clause 4.1): The organization shall determine internal and external issues that are relevant to its purpose and that affect its ability to achieve the intended outcome(s) of its OHS management system.
 Understanding the needs and expectations of workers and other interested parties (clause 4.2): interested parties are workers, suppliers, subcontractors, clients, regulatory authorities.
 Risk and opportunities (Clauses: 6.1.1, 6.1.2.3, 6.1.4): companies are to determine, consider and, where necessary, take action to address any risks or opportunities that may impact (either positively or negatively) the ability of the management system to deliver its intended results, including enhanced health and safety at the workplace.
 Leadership and management commitment (Clauses: 5.1) has stronger emphasis on top management to actively engage and take accountability for the effectiveness of the management system.
 Planning: (clause 6)

See also
 ISO 37001-Anti-bribery management systems
 Safety management systems

Notes

n-[1]

References

External links
ISO website

45001
Occupational safety and health
Safety codes